Campo Santa Maria Formosa is a city square in the Castello district of Venice, Italy.

Buildings around the square
Chiesa di Santa Maria Formosa
Palazzo Priuli Ruzzini Loredan
Palazzo Morosini del Pestrin
Palazzi Donà
Casa Venier
Palazzo Vitturi 
Palazzo Malipiero-Trevisan
Palazzo Querini Stampalia

Piazzas and campos in Venice
Buildings and structures in Castello, Venice